Watergam Rafiabad, is a town located in Baramulla district in the Indian union territory of Jammu and Kashmir. It is located on the banks of Nallah Hamal running parallel to the Baramulla-Rafiabad-Kupwara National Highway NH-701. 
Watergam Rafiabad is the first and only town in Rafiabad constituency also having status of Constituency Headquarter of Rafiabad Assembly segment.It has been brought into the ambit of Urban area in the year 2006-07 by the untired efforts of Welfare Committee Watergam.

History
The town of Watergam has a very rich history. Syed Kirman the famous Muslim preacher chose Watergam as the center of his mission and he is buried here on the hilltop. Giving due credit to its centrality and rich history, J&K Govt. gave Watergam a Tehsil Status which caters to the needs of about 22 villages. The villages from Alsafa colony, Ladoora up to village Pazalpora and Babagund fall under the jurisdiction of this Tehsil.

Geography
Watergam town is called the "Heart of Rafiabad" constituency. It is equidistant to the three nearby towns, Baramulla, Sopore and Handwara. It has a well-established market in Rafiabad. It has a municipal committee to look into different needs of the town. The municipal limits of Watergam extend from Gundkarim Khan in the west up to Behrampora in the east, Rehmatabad (Thagund), Gundmulraj and Chanapora are also part of the Municipal limits.

Demographics
The Watergam city is divided into 13 wards for which elections are held every 5 years. The Watergam Municipal Committee has a population of 7,015 of which 3,939 are males while 3,076 are females as per report released by Census India 2011.

The population of children with the age of 0-6 is 727 which is 10.36% of the total population of Watergam (MC). In Watergam Municipal Committee, Female Sex Ratio is of 781 against state average of 889. Moreover, Child Sex Ratio in Watergam is around 1095 compared to Jammu and Kashmir state average of 862. The literacy rate of Watergam city is 74.60% higher than the state average of 67.16%. In Watergam, Male literacy is around 86.08% while the female literacy rate is 59.31%.

Watergam Municipal Committee has total administration over 932 houses to which it supplies basic amenities like water and sewerage. It is also authorized to build roads within Municipal Committee limits and impose taxes on properties coming under its jurisdiction.

Famous Personalities
Watergam town has been very fertile throughout its history. It has produced some great personalities of the J&K State, the notable among them being  Late Khwaja Khazir Mohd. Malla 

and Mr. Gh. Mustafa Malla. Khwaja Khazir Mohammad Malla was one of the towering figure of erstwhile Kamraz region. He was a big landlord having estates of thousands of hectares stretching from Baramulla to Kupwara and Bandipora. He was a close friend of Bakshi Ghulam Mohammad. Another towering personality of the town is Ghulam Mustafa Malla popularly known as Mus Lala. He is the founder of Asia's second-largest Fruit Mandi Sopore which has been now named as Mustafa Memorial Fruit Mandi Sopore in his honour. This fruit mandi is the commercial hub of the Kashmir valley as the main sector of the economy of Kashmir is based on the horticulture with apples being the main produce. Apples from different parts of valley reach here and then they are transported to different parts of the country.In recent times Mohammad Mudasir Mir @ Mumtaz has contributed a lot in the development of the town. Trauma Hospital, Police Station, Administrative Block, Revenue Complex, Municipality, NTPHC, TSO, H.T.O Handicraft and Handloom Development Office, Ayush Hospital Watergam, Block Sericulture Office, Amusement Park, have been sanctioned to the town only because of his untiring and relentless efforts. 
Some famous scholars are also rendering their services at Kashmir University, SKUAST & various other institutes.

Education
In-Town Watergam Paradise Public High School is the oldest school in Watergam. It is the pioneer school not only for Watergam but for the whole of Rafiabad which has produced the brightest and best minds of the valley. It was founded by Mr Ab. Majeed Lone. Other notable schools include Govt. Girls High School, Holy Faith Public School, KGBV Watergam, Girls Hostel Cum Residency School Iqbal Educational Institute.

Economy
Horticulture is the primary source of the economy with apples as one of the major crops.

References

Cities and towns in Baramulla district
Kashmir